The 2013–2014 cyclo-cross season consists of three international series conducted in the bicycle racing discipline of cyclo-cross:
World Cup
Superprestige
BPost Bank Trophy

The season began on 13 October with the GP Mario De Clercq, won by Sven Nys. It is scheduled to end on 23 February 2013.

Race calendar

National Championships

See also
2014 UCI Cyclo-cross World Championships
2012–2013 cyclo-cross season
 2014–15 cyclo-cross season

References

2013 in cyclo-cross
2014 in cyclo-cross
Cyclo-cross by year